Carolyn Terteling-Payne (born December 20, 1937) is an American politician who served as interim mayor of Boise, Idaho, from 2003 to 2004.

Early life and education 
Terteling-Payne graduated from Boise High School. In 1959, Terteling-Payne earned a Bachelor of Arts degree in English with minors in psychology and French from University of Idaho. Terteling-Payne became the Freshman Class Officer at University of Idaho. Terteling-Payne served in student government and was a member of the university's Executive Board. Terteling-Payne was a member of Phi Beta Kappa, an honor society. Terteling-Payne was a member and President of Gamma Phi Beta sorority.

Career 
In 1993, Terteling-Payne's political career started when she was appointed to the Boise City Council in Idaho. In 1995 and 1999, she won election and continued serving in the city council.

Mayor of Boise 
In 2003, incumbent Boise mayor H. Brent Coles resigned after being charged with the misuse of public funds. In February 2003, Terteling-Payne was appointed as interim mayor of Boise, Idaho to serve the remaining term. She was the first woman mayor of Boise, Idaho. While Terteling-Payne was mayor, she fired city attorney Susan Mimura and city spokeswoman Suzanne Burton. In August 2003, the Office of Internal Audit was created. She was not a candidate for election to a full term in 2003.

Later career 
From 2004 to December 2006, Terteling-Payne served as Idaho director of human resources under then-Governor Jim Risch. Terteling-Payne also served on the board of directors of the St. Luke's Boise Medical Center from 1976 to 2014.

Personal life 
Terteling-Payne's husband was Joseph L. Terteling. In August 1991, after 32 years of marriage, Terteling-Payne divorced Terteling. In May 1995, Terteling-Payne married Frank A. Payne.

References

External links 
 Mayors Past & Present
Biography at City of Boise web site (archived)
 Carolyn Terteling-Payne at linkedin.com
 December 19, 2006 News Clip

1937 births
Idaho city council members
Living people
Mayors of Boise, Idaho
University of Idaho alumni
Women mayors of places in Idaho
20th-century American politicians
20th-century American women politicians
21st-century American politicians
21st-century American women politicians
Women city councillors in Idaho